Silana is a village and former princely state in Gujarat, western India.

History
Silana was a minor princely state of Sorath prant, comprising only the sole village, which during the British raj was handled by the colonial Eastern Kathiawar Agency. 

It was ruled by a Kathi Chieftain. It had a population in 1901 of 774, yielding a state revenue of 6,250 Rupees (1903-4, nearly all from land), paying a tribute of 102 Rupees, to the Gaekwar Baroda State.

External links
 Imperial Gazetteer on DSAL - Kathiawar

Princely states of Gujarat
Kathi princely states